Nur-Pashi Aburkashevich Kulayev (born 1980) is a terrorist and the sole survivor of the 32 hostage-takers in the 2004 Beslan school hostage crisis. A native of Nozhay-Yurtovsky District, Chechnya, Kulayev was a 24-year-old unemployed carpenter at the time of the attack. His brother Han-Pashi Kulayev had formerly served as bodyguard for Shamil Basayev.

Trial
Kulayev's trial began in Vladikavkaz on 17 May 2005, with prosecutors General Nikolai Shepel and Maria Semisynova seeking life imprisonment on charges of terrorism, murder and hostage-taking on behalf of 1343 plaintiffs. The trial judge was Tamerlan Aguzarov, and Kulayev was defended by Umar Sikoyev and Albert Pliyev, the latter of whom had only practised law for just two weeks prior to being appointed by the state.

His defense lay in the claim that he was one of the recruited Chechens who were told they would be attacking a military checkpoint, and had no foreknowledge their target was the Beslan school. The Sydney Morning Herald has been criticized for titling Kulayev the "Timid Guerilla" and referring to him as "more sheepish than sinister."

About a month later, the Mothers of Beslan spawned a new group dubbed the Voice of Beslan, which was considered more radical than the former.

On 16 December 2005, Valery Andreyev, chief of the North Ossetian Federal Security Service (FSB) at the time of the hostage-taking, testified that he had personally given the order to overrun the school during the siege. Four days later it was announced that Alexander Dzasokhov, the former leader of North Ossetia, would testify at Kulayev's trial. His presence was demanded by the Mothers of Beslan.

The verdict
On 16 February 2006, the trial concluded, pending a verdict due 1 July. The Mothers of Beslan reportedly requested the death penalty for Kulayev while the Voice of Beslan lobbied against it. The reading of the verdict began on 16 May 2006, and Kelayev was sentenced to life imprisonment.

In prison
Kulayev was incarcerated in a high-security prison on the small lake island of Ognenny Ostrov in the Vologda region. According to one source, he has been given a new name to protect him from possible retaliation by other inmates. The Vologda Colony authorities refused to comment, saying it was secret information.

Kulayev's appeals, which had the support of some of the Beslan mothers, were turned down, and his life sentence was upheld in December 2006. He did not appear in the courtroom.

In January 2007 the head of the Beslan commission asked the Chief Administration for Penitentiary Service of Russia to confirm or refute the assumption that Kulayev was no longer alive. The Federal Punishment Execution Service refuted this, saying he was in "investigatory custody awaiting delivery for serving his punishment".

See also
 
List of hostage crises

Notes

1980 births
Beslan hostagetakers
Chechen people
Islamic terrorism in Russia
Living people
People convicted on terrorism charges
People from Chechnya
Prisoners sentenced to life imprisonment by Russia
Russian people of Chechen descent
Russian prisoners sentenced to life imprisonment
Sole survivors
Russian mass murderers